A matte painting is a painted representation of a landscape, set, or distant location that allows filmmakers to create the illusion of an environment that is not present at the filming location. Historically, matte painters and film technicians have used various techniques to combine a matte-painted image with live-action footage (compositing). At its best, depending on the skill levels of the artists and technicians, the effect is "seamless" and creates environments that would otherwise be impossible or expensive to film. In the scenes, the painting part is static while movements are integrated on it.

Background 

Traditionally, matte paintings were made by artists using paints or pastels on large sheets of glass for integrating with the live-action footage. The first known matte painting shot was made in 1907 by Norman Dawn (ASC), who improvised the crumbling California Missions by painting them on glass for the movie Missions of California. Notable traditional matte-painting shots include Dorothy's approach to the Emerald City in The Wizard of Oz, Charles Foster Kane's Xanadu in Citizen Kane, and the seemingly bottomless tractor-beam set of Star Wars Episode IV: A New Hope. The documentary The Making of Star Wars mentioned the technique used for the tractor beam scene as being a glass painting.

By the mid-1980s, advancements in computer graphics programs allowed matte painters to work in the digital realm. The first digital matte shot was created by painter Chris Evans in 1985 for Young Sherlock Holmes for a scene featuring a computer-graphics (CG) animation of a knight leaping from a stained-glass window. Evans first painted the window in acrylics, then scanned the painting into LucasFilm's Pixar system for further digital manipulation. The computer animation (another first) blended perfectly with the digital matte, which could not have been accomplished using a traditional matte painting.

New technologies 
Throughout the 1990s, traditional matte paintings were still in use, but more often in conjunction with digital compositing. Die Hard 2 (1990) was the first film to use digitally composited live-action footage with a traditional glass matte painting that had been photographed and scanned into a computer. It was for the last scene, which took place on an airport runway. By the end of the decade, the time of hand-painted matte paintings was drawing to a close, although as late as 1997 some traditional paintings were still being made, notably Chris Evans’ painting of the  rescue ship in James Cameron’s Titanic.

Paint has now been superseded by digital images created using photo references, 3-D models, and drawing tablets. Matte painters combine their digitally matte painted textures within computer-generated 3-D environments, allowing for 3-D camera movement. Lighting algorithms used to simulate lighting sources expanded in scope in 1995, when radiosity rendering was applied to film for the first time in Martin Scorsese's Casino.  Matte World Digital collaborated with LightScape to simulate the indirect bounce-light effect of millions of neon lights of the 1970s-era Las Vegas strip. Lower computer processing times continue to alter and expand matte painting technologies and techniques. Matte painting techniques are also implemented in concept art and used often in games and even high end production techniques in animation.

Notable uses 

 
 The army barracks in All Quiet on the Western Front (1930).
 Count Dracula's castle exteriors in Dracula (1931) and other scenes.
 The view of Skull Island in King Kong (1933).
 Charlie Chaplin's blindfold roller-skating beside the illusory drop in Modern Times (1936).
 The view of Nottingham Castle in The Adventures of Robin Hood (1938).
 The 1942 spy thriller Saboteur, directed by Alfred Hitchcock, is enhanced by numerous matte shots, ranging from a California aircraft factory to the climactic scene atop New York's Statue of Liberty. 
Black Narcissus  (1947) by Powell and Pressburger, scenes of the Himalayan convent.
 Several external views and the 20 miles-a-side cube left by the Ancients in Forbidden Planet (1956).
 In Alfred Hitchcock's North by Northwest (1959) shots of The United Nations building, Mount Rushmore and the Mount Rushmore house. 
 Birds flying over Bodega Bay, looking down at the town below, in Alfred Hitchcock's The Birds (1963).
 Mary Poppins gliding over London with her umbrella, the St Paul's Cathedral and London's rooftops and aerial views in Mary Poppins (1964).
 The iconic image of the Statue of Liberty at the end of Planet of the Apes (1968).
 Diabolik's underground lair and various locations in Danger: Diabolik (1968).
 Virtually all of the exterior shots of San Francisco in The Love Bug (1968).
 The rooftops of Portobello Road, the English landscape, Miss Price's house and other scenes in Bedknobs and Broomsticks (1971) (special effects won an Academy Award).
 The city railway line in The Sting (1973).
 Views of a destroyed Los Angeles in Earthquake (1974) for which Albert Whitlock won an Academy Award.
 The stone column demolished by the locomotive in the Chicago station in the film Silver Streak.
 The Death Star's laser tunnel in Star Wars (1977).
 The Starfleet headquarters in Star Trek The Motion Picture (1979).
 The background for all scenes featuring Imperial walkers in The Empire Strikes Back (1980).
 The final scene of the secret government warehouse in Steven Spielberg's Raiders of the Lost Ark (1981).
 The Roy and Deckard chase scene in Blade Runner (1982).
 The view of the crashed space ship in The Thing (1982).
 The view of the OCP tower in RoboCop (1987) and other scenes.
 Gotham City street scene in Batman (1989).
 The Karl G. Jansky Very Large Array in Contact (1997).
 The Magic Railroad in Thomas and the Magic Railroad (2000).
 The cityscape behind the Barnums' first apartment in The Greatest Showman (2017).

Notable matte painters and technicians 
 Michael Pangrazio
 Walter Percy Day
 Norman Dawn
 Linwood G. Dunn
 Emilio Ruiz del Rio
 Harrison Ellenshaw
 Peter Ellenshaw
 Albert Whitlock
 Matthew Yuricich
 Fréderic St-Arnaud

See also 
 Bipack
 Chroma key
 Compositing
 Video matting
 Digital matte artist
 Optical printing

References

Books
 
 Peter Ellenshaw; Ellenshaw Under Glass – Going to the Matte for Disney
 Richard Rickitt: Special Effects: The History and Technique. Billboard Books; 2nd edition, 2007;  (Chapter 5 covers the history and techniques of movie matte painting.)

Film and video technology
Cinematic techniques
Background artists
Painting techniques
Optical illusions